Héctor Méndez is the name of:

 Héctor Méndez (boxer) (1897–1977), Argentine welterweight professional boxer
 Héctor Méndez (actor) (1913–1980), Argentine film actor
 Héctor Méndez (rugby union), Argentine former rugby union footballer and coach